Pedro Luís Pereira de Sousa (December 13, 1839 – July 16, 1884) was a Brazilian poet, politician, orator and lawyer, adept of the "Condorist" movement. He is the patron of the 31st chair of the Brazilian Academy of Letters.

Life
Pedro Luís was born in Araruama, in 1839. He made his primary studies in the Instituto Freeze, in Nova Friburgo, where he met Casimiro de Abreu. Graduated in Law in the Faculdade de Direito da Universidade de São Paulo in 1860, he established himself as a lawyer in Rio de Janeiro. A deputy between 1864–1866 and 1878–1881, he would also become minister of Foreign Affairs in 1880 and the governor of Bahia in 1882. Among many others, he was decorated with the Order of the Rose.

He died in 1884.

Works
 Terribilis Dea (1860)
 Os Voluntários da Morte (1864)
 A Sombra de Tiradentes e Nunes Machado (1866)
 Prisca Fides (1876)

Trivia
 He was the uncle of former Brazilian president Washington Luís.
 His major work, Terribilis Dea, heavily influenced Castro Alves, who wrote a poem based on it, named "Deusa incruenta".

External links
 Extracts of poems by Pedro Luís at the official site of the Brazilian Academy of Letters 
 Pedro Luís' biography at the official site of the Brazilian Academy of Letters

References

1839 births
1884 deaths
19th-century Brazilian poets
Romantic poets
People from Araruama
Portuguese-language writers
Patrons of the Brazilian Academy of Letters
University of São Paulo alumni
Governors of Bahia
Foreign ministers of Brazil
Members of the Chamber of Deputies (Empire of Brazil)
Brazilian male poets
19th-century Brazilian male writers